Flemingites is a genus of evolute ammonoids from the Lower Triassic with spiral ridges on the shell.

Diagnosis
The shell of Flemingites is evolute so that all whorls show externally.  Whorls are robust, slightly embracing, usually a little higher than wide and increasing very slowly. The venter (outside rim) is somewhat flattened and usually much narrower that the widest part of the whorl.
Strong, always single, lateral ribs are confined to the sides. Fine spiral ridges typically cover the shell, found even in casts. The suture is distinctly ceratitic with rounded entire saddles and deep serrated lobes.

Taxonomic position
Smith, J.P (1932) included Flemingites in the Xenodiscidae, which was included in the superfamily Prolecanitoidea (note spelling as of date given). Later it was reassigned to the Flemingitidae and Noritaceae as shown in part L of the American Treatise

Other classifications put Flemingites in the Meekocerataceae, or as recently renamed, Meekoceratoidea.

Distribution
Flemingites is found widespread throughout the northern hemisphere  and is thought to have been derived from Ophiceras.

References

Ceratitida genera
Ammonites of North America
Early Triassic ammonites